Diego Armando González Vega (born 8 May 1986) is a Chilean former professional footballer who played as a forward.

Honours
Everton
 Primera B de Chile: 2011 Clausura

External links 
 
 
 Diego González at playmakerstats.com (English version of ceroacero.es)

1986 births
Living people
People from Quillota
Chilean footballers
Association football forwards
Unión La Calera footballers
Lota Schwager footballers
Cruz Azul Hidalgo footballers
Everton de Viña del Mar footballers
Deportes Temuco footballers
Deportivo Guaymallén players
Independiente Rivadavia footballers
Atlético Tucumán footballers
Primera B de Chile players
Chilean Primera División players
Liga Premier de México players
Segunda División Profesional de Chile players
Primera Nacional players
Chilean expatriate footballers
Chilean expatriate sportspeople in Argentina
Expatriate footballers in Argentina
Chilean expatriate sportspeople in Mexico
Expatriate footballers in Mexico